
Inkachaka Dam (Aymara and Quechua, inka Inca, chaka bridge, "Inca bridge") is a dam in Bolivia situated in the La Paz Department, Pedro Domingo Murillo Province, La Paz Municipality, north east of La Paz.

See also 
 Sirk'i Quta

References 

 grande.civil.tohoku.ac.jp Dr. Eng. Andrés Calizaya Terceros, "Water supply system of La Paz and El Alto cities, Bolivia", 2009, containing basic information about the dams of the area

External links 
 desastres.unanleon.edu.ni Basic information about the dams around La Paz

Dams in Bolivia
Lakes of La Paz Department (Bolivia)
Buildings and structures in La Paz Department (Bolivia)
Dams completed in 1990